Khushboo Bangla is an Indian cable entertainment company based in New Delhi. It airs programming in the Bangla language. The channel is also available in various areas of India. It started to broadcast on 14 October 2017 as the Bangla language cable channel in India. The channel mostly airs content intended for family and coming-of-age generations. Its main audience attraction is Bangla movies. This channel has aired a Bangladeshi television drama series which name is Crime Patrol.

Current Programming
Adventure Stories
Magical Stories
Bangla Golpo
Chacha Bhatija
Husir Khazhana
Fun Time

Formar Show
Crime Watch
Funcho
Mowgli
Bangla Comedy
Fun Unlimited

References

Manoranjan Group
Bengali-language television channels in India
Television channels and stations established in 2017
Television stations in Kolkata
2017 establishments in Delhi
Movie channels in India